This article lists diplomatic missions resident in Norway. At present, the capital city of Oslo hosts 71 embassies. Several other countries have ambassadors accredited to Norway, with most being resident in Stockholm, Copenhagen and London.

Diplomatic missions in Oslo

Consulates in Norway

Representative offices 
 (Delegation)

Non-resident embassies 
Resident in Berlin, Germany:

 
 
 
 
 
 
 
 

Resident in Brussels, Belgium:

  
 
 
 
 
 

Resident in Copenhagen, Denmark:

Resident in London, United Kingdom:

Resident in Stockholm, Sweden:

 

Resident in The Hague, Netherlands:
 
 

Resident in other cities:

  (Andorra la Vella)
  (Geneva)
  (Dublin)
  (Valletta)
  (Paris)
  (Geneva)
  (Singapore)
  (Vienna)

Closed missions

Embassies in Oslo
 
  (closed in 2015)

Consulates in Bergen 
  (closed in 1953)

See also 
 Foreign relations of Norway
 List of diplomatic missions of Norway
 Visa requirements for Norwegian citizens

Notes

References

External links
 Oslo Diplomatic List

 
Diplomatic
Norway